Gary Wilton Gates Jr. (born July 22, 1959) is a Texas businessman and a Republican member of the Texas House of Representatives for House District 28, which is located in Fort Bend County in the southwest Houston metro area.

Texas House of Representatives 
On January 28, 2020, Gates won the special runoff election for Texas House District 28. He defeated the Democrat, an educator, Elizabeth A. "Eliz" Markowitz of Katy, Texas, by 58% of the vote to 42%, a 16-point win that has been characterized as an "easy win".  Saying the district was a bellwether, Democratic Presidential candidates Joe Biden and Elizabeth Warren endorsed Markowitz; and Mike Bloomberg and Julian Castro endorsed Markowitz and block walked for her, attempting to flip the district and defeat Gates. Former U.S. Senate nominee and presidential candidate Beto O'Rourke knocked on doors and rallied canvassers.  The race was Gates' seventh run for political office.

After the election, the Republicans criticized the Democrats as overplaying their hand in the Gates special election; while the Democrats pointed to unique aspects of the campaign, specifically Gates' ability to self-fund his campaign. Gates spent about $1.8 million of his own money on the campaign.  Markowitz was given political donations from Forward Majority for $420,000, Democratic Legislative Campaign Committee for $170,000, and State Representative Celia Israel's Texas House Democrat Campaign Committee  of $120,000.

Turnout for the special runoff election was very high and possibly historic since there were over 30,000 voters, a 20 percent turnout which is the highest in Texas since at least 1992.  Gates defeated a Republican opponent, small business owner Michelle D. "Schell" Hammel of Katy, in the March 3, 2020 primary, receiving 95% of the vote. Gates will face Markowitz again in November 2020 in the general election.

Gates supports a ban on Democrats being given committee chairmanships as long as the Republicans hold the majority of seats.

Personal life
Gates lives in Richmond, Texas, a suburb of Houston southwest of the city, with his wife, Melissa, and his 13 children, of whom 11 are adopted.

References

External links
 

Living people
1959 births
Place of birth missing (living people)
Businesspeople from Texas
Christians from Texas
Republican Party members of the Texas House of Representatives
Rogers State University alumni
21st-century American politicians